Membership of the Academia Europaea (MAE) is an award conferred by the Academia Europaea to individuals that have demonstrated "sustained academic excellence". Membership is by invitation only by existing MAE only and judged during a peer review selection process. Members are entitled to use the post-nominal letters MAE.

Members of the Academia Europaea
New members are announced annually, every year since 1988. For a more complete list see Category:Members of Academia Europaea.. Some Members of the Academia Europaea have received very prestigious awards, medals and prizes, such as:
 The Nobel Prize e.g. Christiane Nüsslein-Volhard (1995, Physiology), Arvid Carlsson (2000, Physiology or Medicine), Paul Nurse (2001, Physiology or Medicine), Tim Hunt (2001, Physiology or Medicine), Kurt Wüthrich (2002, Chemistry), John Sulston (2002, Physiology or Medicine), Sydney Brenner 2002, Physiology or Medicine, Aaron Ciechanover (2004, Chemistry), Roy J. Glauber (2005, Physics), Roger D. Kornberg (2006, Chemistry), Gerhard Ertl (2007, Chemistry), Richard Tol (2007, shared winner of the Nobel Peace Prize), Harald zur Hausen (2008, Physiology or Medicine), Luc Montagnier (2008, Physiology or Medicine), Robert G. Edwards (2010, Physiology or Medicine), John B. Gurdon (2012, Physiology or Medicine), Rita Levi-Montalcini (1986, Physiology)
 The Wolf Prize, e.g. Simon Donaldson (2020), Alexander Beilinson (2018), Peter Zoller (2013), Alain Aspect (2010), Anton Zeilinger (2010), Axel Ullrich (2010), David Baulcombe (2010), Howard Cedar (2008), Albert Fert (2006/2007), Alexander Levitzki (2005), Sergei P. Novikov (2005), Alexander Varshavsky (2001), Saharon Shelah (2001), Vladimir I. Arnold (2001).
 The Turing Award, e.g. Joseph Sifakis (2007), Adi Shamir (2002).
 The Fields Medal, e.g. Martin Hairer (2014), Elon Lindenstrauss (2010), Stanislav Smirnov (2010), Cédric Villani (2010), Wendelin Werner (2006), Timothy Gowers (1998), Maxim Kontsevich (1998), Jean Bourgain (1994), Pierre-Louis Lions (1994), Simon Donaldson (1986), Enrico Bombieri (1974), Sergei P. Novikov (1970), Michael Atiyah (1966).
 The Lasker Award, e.g. Roy Calne (2012), David Weatherall (2010), John Gurdon (2009), David Baulcombe (2008), Alec Jeffreys (2005), Pierre Chambon (2004), Robert Edwards (2001), Sydney Brenner (2000), Aaron Ciechanover (2000), Alexander Varshavsky (2000).
 The Abel Prize, e.g. Andrew Wiles (2016), Endre Szemerédi (2012), Mikhail Leonidovich Gromov (2009), Jacques Tits (2008), Lennart Carleson (2006), Michael Atiyah (2004).
 The Gödel Prize, e.g. Christos H. Papadimitriou (2012), Johan Hastad (2011, 1994), Alexander Razborov (2007), Noga Alon (2005), László Lovász (2001), Moshe Vardi	(2000), Pierre Wolper (2000).

Honorary members
To be considered for election to honorary membership, candidate should be people who, by means other than through their own individual scholarship have made a significant contribution to the achievement of the objectives of the Academia Europaea. Honorary Members include:
Irina Bokova
Gro Harlem Brundtland
Philippe Busquin
Rafał Dutkiewicz
Seamus Heaney
Ralph Kohn
Frank H. T. Rhodes
Klaus Tschira

References

Academic awards
Academia Europaea
European awards